Trichopalpus fraternus is a species of fly in the family Scathophagidae. It is found in the  Palearctic .

References

Scathophagidae
Insects described in 1826
Brachyceran flies of Europe